Djurö is an island, a surrounding archipelago of some 30 islands, and a national park situated in Sweden's biggest lake, Vänern.

The islands are presently uninhabited, but there is a hunting lodge and an unmanned lighthouse. Wildlife includes fallow deer and a great variety of birds including ospreys, hobby, oystercatchers and great black-backed gulls. The horizon of Djurö consists only of water, except in southern direction where Kinnekulle is visible.

See also 
List of national parks of Sweden

References

External links 

 Sweden's National Parks: Djurö National Park from the Swedish Environmental Protection Agency

National parks of Sweden
Lake islands of Sweden
Geography of Västra Götaland County
Islands of Västra Götaland County
Protected areas established in 1991
1991 establishments in Sweden
Tourist attractions in Västra Götaland County